USS Pluck is a name used more than once by the U.S. Navy:

 , a coastal minesweeper placed in service 6 October 1942.
 , a fleet minesweeper commissioned 11 August 1954.

United States Navy ship names